Daniel Specklin  (or Speckle or Speckel) (1536 – 18 October 1589) was an Alsatian fortress architect, engineer, and cartographer.

He was born and died in Strasbourg.

Printed works 
Architectura von Vestungen (strassburg 1589)

Further reading 
 Albert Fischer: Daniel Specklin aus Strassburg (1536 - 1589): Festungsbaumeister, Ingenieur und Kartograph; Sigmaringen, 1996. 
 Franz Grenacher: Vor vierhundert Jahren schuf Daniel Specklin seine Elsasskarte. In: Basler Geographische Hefte n.2 1973 
 Rodolphe Peter: Daniel Specklin (1536 - 1589) et l'art des fortifications. In: Grandes Figures de l'Humanisme Alsacien: courants, milieux, destins. Strasbourg, 1978, S. 203–219 
 Richard Schadow: Daniel Specklin, seine Leben und seine Tätigkeit als Baumeister. In: Jahrbuch des Vogesen-Clubs 2 (1886), S. 5–60
 Otto Winckelmann: Zur Lebens- und Familiengeschichte Daniel Specklins. In: ZGO 59 (1905), S. 605–620

1536 births
1589 deaths
Architects  from Strasbourg
16th-century French architects
Renaissance architects
German military engineers
16th-century German engineers
Engineers from Strasbourg